The James C. Flood Mansion is a historic mansion at 1000 California Street, atop Nob Hill in San Francisco, California, USA.  Now home of the Pacific-Union Club, it was built in 1886 as the townhouse for James C. Flood, a 19th-century silver baron. It was the first brownstone building west of the Mississippi River, and the only mansion on Nob Hill to structurally survive the 1906 San Francisco earthquake and fire.  It was declared a National Historic Landmark in 1966.

Description and history

The Flood Mansion occupies an entire city block on Nob Hill, bounded by California, Taylor, Mason, and Sacramento Streets.  The block is fenced on three sides by bronze fencing installed at the time of the mansion's construction.  It is a large masonry structure, three stories in height, its exterior finished in brownstone quarried in Portland, Connecticut and shipped around Cape Horn. It is an elaborate expression of Classical Revival architecture, with corner quoining, a balustraded roof edge, and windows framed by pilasters and elaborate pediments.  The main entrance, facing California Street, is sheltered by a broad and deep three-bay portico supported by clustered square columns.

The mansion was built by James C. Flood, who made his fortune in the silver mines of Nevada.  His inspiration for the building were the Gilded Age mansions he saw on the East Coast of the United States, so he commissioned one from architect Augustus Laver.  Completed in 1888, it was one of his homes until his death in 1889, and was occupied by his daughter when it was gutted during the 1906 earthquake and fire.  She sold the shell of the building to the Pacific-Union Club, which originally contemplated tearing it down.  It ended up commissioning Willis Polk to design alterations including a third floor and a new interior.  These alterations included the use of additional brownstone, furnished from the same quarries as the original material.

The mansion was the only one on Nob Hill to survive the 1906 earthquake and fire; the other mansions on the hill were built of wood, with finishes that gave them the appearance of stone, and were destroyed.

See also
 List of San Francisco Designated Landmarks
 List of National Historic Landmarks in California
 National Register of Historic Places listings in San Francisco

References

External links

Houses in San Francisco
Nob Hill, San Francisco
Houses completed in 1886
National Register of Historic Places in San Francisco
National Historic Landmarks in the San Francisco Bay Area
San Francisco Designated Landmarks
Historic American Buildings Survey in California
Gilded Age mansions
Houses on the National Register of Historic Places in San Francisco